This is the list of Oceanian junior records in Olympic weightlifting. They are the best results set in competition by athletes aged 20 throughout the entire calendar year of the performance. Records are maintained in each weight class for the snatch, clean and jerk, and the total for both by the Oceania Weightlifting Federation (OWF).

Current records
Key to tables:

Men

Women

Historical records

Men (1998–2018)

Women (1998–2018)

References
General
Oceanian Junior Records December 2022 updated
Specific

External links
OWF official website

Weightlifting in Oceania
Oceanian, junior
Weightlifting junior